Sydney Mikayla Shepherd (born February 1, 2003), known professionally as Sydney Mikayla, is an American actress. In 2014, Mikayla portrayed Olympic gymnast Gabby Douglas in the Lifetime biopic for which she won a Young Artist Award. From 2019 to 2022, Mikayla was a cast member in the ABC daytime soap opera, General Hospital, in the role of Trina Robinson. She also voices the role of Wolf in the Netflix animated series Kipo and the Age of Wonderbeasts.

Early life and education
Sydney Mikayla Shepherd was born on February 1, 2003, the daughter of Sonya Shepherd and Derek Shepherd. Sonya is also an actress who has worked on Broadway, television, and film. While Sonya did not push her daughter into acting, she supported her Mikayla's choice to pursue acting as a career. Sonya enrolled Mikayla in acting classes at age 5 at the Amazing Grace Conservatory. There, she studied under veteran actress Wendy Raquel Robinson. Mikayla also began dancing at Debbie Allen's Dance Academy. Before she booked General Hospital, Mikayla attended a public performing arts high school. In 2019, Mikayla began home-schooling to accommodate her work schedule. Though she is an only child, Mikayla has a dog called Champ. Having been accepted to 14 different colleges and universities, Mikayla ultimately chose to attend college at the University of California, Los Angeles beginning in the fall of 2021.

Career
Mikayla's earliest roles included an episode of her favorite childhood television show, Yo Gabba Gabba! and an episode of the daytime soap opera, Days of Our Lives. In 2011, Mikayla booked her first credited role in the television film, Little in Common, which was intended to serve as a series pilot. She would later go on to appear in episodes of Parenthood, Hawthorne, Community, Hot in Cleveland and Whitney. In 2013, Mikayla was cast as a young Gabby Douglas in  the Lifetime biopic, opposite Academy Award winner, Regina King. Mikayla would win the Young Artist Award for her portrayal of Douglas in 2014. Following the success and critical acclaim of The Gabby Douglas Story, Mikayla would go on to appear in episodes of Instant Mom, Teachers, Game Shakers and Fuller House. Mikayla explained that there was a period of time where she had difficulty booking roles due to the fact that she was tall for her age. In late 2018, Mikayla joined the cast of General Hospital in the recurring role of Trina Robinson. She was offered a contract with the series a few months after her debut in February 2019. In October 2021, it was announced that Mikayla had opted to appear in a recurring capacity as she started college, and revealed the show agreed to work around her schedule. On March 4, 2022, Soap Opera Digest announced she would vacate the role on March 17 and the character had been recast. Executive producer Frank Valentini and Mikayla informed the magazine of the actress' decision to focus on school full-time.

Mikayla has also found success as a voice actor with having voiced characters in episodes of the animated series, The Loud House and We Bare Bears. In 2018, just before she booked General Hospital, Mikayla voiced the role of Wolf in the Netflix series Kipo and the Age of Wonderbeasts.

Filmography

Awards and nominations

References

External links

2003 births
Living people
African-American actresses
American soap opera actresses
21st-century American actresses
People from Los Angeles
21st-century African-American women
21st-century African-American people